Cissone is a comune (municipality) in the Province of Cuneo in the Italian region Piedmont, located about  southeast of Turin and about  northeast of Cuneo.

Cissone borders the following municipalities: Bossolasco, Dogliani, Roddino, and Serravalle Langhe.

Demographic evolution

References

Cities and towns in Piedmont